William Ragsdale (born 1961) is an American actor.

William Ragsdale may also refer to:

 William P. Ragsdale (1837–1877), Hawaiian lawyer and translator
William A. Ragsdale House

See also
 William Ragsdale Cannon (1916–1997), American United Methodist bishop